Benoît Giasson (born 4 December 1964) is a Canadian fencer. He competed in the foil events at the 1988 and 1992 Summer Olympics.

References

1964 births
Living people
Canadian male fencers
Olympic fencers of Canada
Fencers at the 1988 Summer Olympics
Fencers at the 1992 Summer Olympics
Fencers from Montreal
French Quebecers
Pan American Games medalists in fencing
Pan American Games silver medalists for Canada
Pan American Games bronze medalists for Canada
Fencers at the 1987 Pan American Games
Fencers at the 1991 Pan American Games
20th-century Canadian people